Warmfield cum Heath is a civil parish in the metropolitan borough of the City of Wakefield, West Yorkshire, England.  The parish contains 57 listed buildings that are recorded in the National Heritage List for England.  Of these, six are listed at Grade I, the highest of the three grades, six are at Grade II*, the middle grade, and the others are at Grade II, the lowest grade.  The parish contains the settlements of Warmfield, Heath, Kirkthorpe, Goosehill, and the surrounding countryside.  The major building in the parish is Heath Hall, a country house, which is listed together with associated buildings and structures.  Most of the other listed buildings are houses, cottages and associated structures.  The rest of the listed buildings include a church and a group of grave slabs in the churchyard, a block of former almshouses, a water tower, farmhouses and farm buildings, a public house, former schools and a master's house, a set of stocks, two well covers, a boathouse, a weir and sluice gates on the River Calder, and a telephone kiosk.


Key

Buildings

References

Citations

Sources

 

Lists of listed buildings in West Yorkshire